Wattstown Barrows are two tumuli (barrows) which form a National Monument in County Westmeath, Ireland.

Location
Wattstown Barrows are located near the summit of Frewin Hill (173 m / 568 ft high), overlooking Lough Owel to the east.

Description
Wattstown Barrows are a ring barrow and bowl barrow, burial sites of the Bronze Age, joined together by extending a bank and ditch from the ring barrow in an arc around the bowl barrow. There is also another bowl barrow and a tumulus or cairn.

According to legend, Frewin Hill was the site of the Battle of Frémainn in AD 507, where Failge Berraide defeated Fiachu mac Néill.

References

Archaeological sites in County Westmeath
National Monuments in County Westmeath